Artem Oleksandrovych Hryshchenko (born 29 April 1993) is a Ukrainian professional footballer who plays as a midfielder.

Player career
In 2010, he started his career at Yunist Chernihiv. From 2011 to 2012, he played for Polissya Dobryanka. In 2013, he played in the amateur championship of Ukraine as part of the YSB Chernihiv. He then joined Karpaty Lviv, but due to the high competition in the first team, he played only in the reserve team of here. At the beginning of March 2015, he joined the Nyva Ternopil, making his debut on 21 March against Stal Kamianske in Ukrainian First League. On 1 May, he scored his first goal against Naftovyk Okhtyrka. In the summer of 2015, he moved to Desna Chernihiv and made his debut on 26 July against Naftovyk Okhtyrka. On 21 May 2016, he scored his only goal for the Desnians against FC Ternopil. In 2016 he moved to Avanhard Koryukivka. In summer 2017 he moved to Sumy where he ended his career.

References

External links
 Hryshchenko Artem Oleksandrovych at upl.ua 
 Hryshchenko Artem Oleksandrovych at pfl.ua 
 Artem Gryshchenko at soccerway.com 

1993 births
Living people
Footballers from Chernihiv
FC Yunist Chernihiv players
FC Chernihiv players
FC Desna Chernihiv players
FC Avanhard Koriukivka players
FC Nyva Ternopil players
PFC Sumy players
Ukrainian footballers
Association football central defenders
Ukrainian First League players